Gary Thomas (born June 10, 1961) is an American jazz saxophonist and flautist, born in Baltimore, Maryland. He was a member of Jack DeJohnette's Special Edition band and has worked with John McLaughlin, Herbie Hancock, Pat Metheny, John Scofield, Jim Hall, Dave Holland, Greg Osby, Wayne Shorter, Ravi Coltrane, Cassandra Wilson, Wallace Roney, Steve Coleman, and Miles Davis.

Thomas was the Director and Chair of Jazz Studies at Johns Hopkins University in Baltimore.

Discography

As leader
 The Seventh Quadrant (Enja,1987)
 Code Violations (Enja, 1988)
 By Any Means Necessary (JMT, 1989) 
 While the Gate Is Open (JMT, 1990)
 The Kold Kage (JMT, 1991)
 Corporate Art (JMT, 1991)
 Till We Have Faces (JMT, 1992)
 Exile's Gate (JMT, 1993)
 Overkill (JMT, 1995)
 Found on Sordid Streets (Winter & Winter, 1997)
 Pariah's Pariah (Winter & Winter, 1998)

As sideman

With Cecil Brooks III
The Collective (Muse, 1989)
With Uri Caine
Sphere Music (JMT, 1993)
Toys (JMT, 1996)
With George Colligan
Ultimatum (Criss Cross, 2002)
Mad Science (Sunny Sky, 2003)
With Corpulent (Joel Grip & Devin Gray)
Wolfwalk (Umlaut, 2005)
With Jack DeJohnette
Irresistible Forces (Impulse!/MCA, 1987)
Audio-Visualscapes (Impulse!/MCA, 1988)
Earthwalk (Blue Note, 1991)
Extra Special Edition (Blue Note, 1994)
With Herbie Hancock and John McLaughlin
Carnegie Hall Salutes The Jazz Masters compilation (Verve, 1994)  (Thomas appears on the track It's About That Time)
With Wallace Roney
Verses (Muse, 1987)
Intuition (Muse, 1988)
The Standard Bearer (Muse, 1989)
Obsession (Muse, 1990)
No Job Too Big Or Small (Savoy Jazz, 1999)
With Tony Reedus
Incognito (Enja, 1989)
With Paul Bollenback
Brightness of Being (Elefant Dreams, 2006)
With Jacek Kochan
Man of No Words (Gowi, 2008)
With John B. Arnold
Logorhythms (La Frontiera, 2004)
With Cassandra Wilson
Jumpworld (JMT, 1990)
With Christy Doran, Mark Helias and Bobby Previte
Corporate Art (JMT, 1991)
With Peter Herborn
Traces of Trane (JMT, 1992)
Large One (1997)
Large Two (2002)
With Gabrielle Goodman
Travelin' Light (JMT, 1993)
Until We Love (JMT, 1994)
With Sam Rivers' Rivbea All-star Orchestra
Inspiration (BMG France, 1999)
Culmination (BMG France, 1999)
With Greg Osby
The Invisible Hand (Blue Note, 1999)
With Stefon Harris
Black Action Figure (Blue Note, 1999)
With Peter Herborn
Large 2 (Jazzline, 2002)
With Ingrid Jensen
Higher Grounds (Enja, 1999)
With Terri Lyne Carrington
Jazz Is a Spirit (ACT, 2002)
With Lonnie Plaxico
So Alive (Eighty-Eight's, 2004)
West Side Stories (Plaxmusic, 2006)
With John McLaughlin
The Heart of Things (Verve, 1997)
The Heart of Things: Live in Paris (Verve, 2000)
With Steve Coleman
Sine Die (Pangaea, 1988)
With Tom Williams
Introducing Tom Williams (Criss Cross, 1991)
With Adam Pierończyk
Digivooco (PAO, 2001)
With Andrzej Cudzich
  Able To Listen (Polonia, 1996)

References

1960 births
American jazz saxophonists
American male saxophonists
African-American saxophonists
African-American jazz musicians
Avant-garde jazz saxophonists
Post-bop saxophonists
Enja Records artists
Free funk saxophonists
Johns Hopkins University faculty
Living people
Jazz saxophonists
Miles Davis
Musicians from Baltimore
21st-century saxophonists
Jazz musicians from Maryland
American male jazz musicians
Winter & Winter Records artists
JMT Records artists